Djuna is a South Korean science fiction writer and film critic. Djuna is managed by Greenbook Agency.

Life 
The identity of Djuna is unknown, and Djuna prefers the personal pronoun "they." They publish all their works under the name Djuna, and interviews are done by e-mail correspondence or online chats. For some of their early works, they used the name Lee Youngsoo, but it is generally taken as a pseudonym, because Lee Youngsoo is one of the most common names in Korea.

They explain the name Djuna as follows: "We just took the name for our ID for HiTel, as we were reading the book of Djuna Barnes. The capitalization was due to the Caps Lock key, and we felt it would be a bit strange not to capitalize a name."

From 2020 to 2021, Djuna served as the second President of the Science Fiction Writers Union of the Republic of Korea, following their first president Soyeon Jeong.

Work 
Since the 1990s, Djuna has been one of the most prolific and important writers in the South Korean science fiction field. They have published seven short story collections, six novels, and two essays.

Short story collections 
 Butterfly War (나비전쟁) 1997
 Duty Free Area (면세구역) 2000
 Pacific Express (태평양 횡단 특급) 2002
 Proxy War (대리전) 2006
 Teeth of the Dragon (용의 이) 2007
 Bloody Battle on the Broccoli Field (브로콜리 평원의 혈투) 2011
 Not Yet a God (아직은 신이 아니야) 2013

Novels 
 Molok (몰록) 2001
 The Shadow of Spiderweb (거미줄 그늘) 2009
 Jezebel (제저벨) 2012
 The World of Mint (민트의 세계) 2018
There I existed In Arcadia (아르카디아에도 나는 있었다) 2019
평형추 2021

Film criticism 
 Complaining over the Screen (스크린 앞에서 투덜대기) 2001
 Film Shakespeare (필름 셰익스피어) 2005
 Genre Encyclopedia: SF Film (장르백서 2: SF영화) 2015

Non-fiction 
 Possible Spaces of Dreams: Djuna Essay (가능한 꿈의 공간들:듀나 에세이) 2015

References 

South Korean novelists
Living people
Year of birth missing (living people)
South Korean science fiction writers